Tree Streets Historic District may refer to:

Tree Streets Historic District (Johnson City, Tennessee), listed on the National Register of Historic Places in Washington County, Tennessee
Tree Streets Historic District (Waynesboro, Virginia), listed on the National Register of Historic Places in Waynesboro, Virginia